Hyparpax aurostriata is a species of moth in the family Notodontidae (the prominents). It was first described by Graef in 1888 and it is found in North America.

The MONA or Hodges number for Hyparpax aurostriata is 8025.

References

Further reading

 
 
 

Notodontidae
Articles created by Qbugbot
Moths described in 1888